Old Hoopes School is a historic one-room school building located in Derry Township, Mifflin County, Pennsylvania. It was built about 1873 and is a 1-story brick building with a cobblestone foundation and a gable roof. It measures three bays by one bay.

It was added to the National Register of Historic Places in 1978.

References

One-room schoolhouses in Pennsylvania
School buildings on the National Register of Historic Places in Pennsylvania
School buildings completed in 1873
Buildings and structures in Mifflin County, Pennsylvania
National Register of Historic Places in Mifflin County, Pennsylvania